The 2013 Open d'Orléans was a professional tennis tournament played on hard courts. It was the ninth edition of the tournament which was part of the 2013 ATP Challenger Tour. It took place in Orléans, France between 23 and 29 September 2013.

Singles main-draw entrants

Seeds

 1 Rankings are as of September 16, 2013.

Other entrants
The following players received wildcards into the singles main draw:
  Benoît Paire
  Michaël Llodra
  Albano Olivetti
  Pierre-Hugues Herbert

The following players received entry from the qualifying draw:
  Sandro Ehrat
  Henri Laaksonen
  Stefan Seifert
  Yann Marti

Champions

Singles

 Radek Štěpánek def.  Leonardo Mayer 6–3, 6–4

Doubles

 Illya Marchenko /  Sergiy Stakhovsky def.  Ričardas Berankis /  Franko Škugor 7–5, 6–3

External links
Official Website